Events from the year 1617 in art.

Events
Kanō Tan'yū becomes an official artist of the Tokugawa shogunate.
Lucas Vorsterman joins the workshop of Peter Paul Rubens, soon becoming Rubens's primary engraver.

Works

Abu al-Hasan - Shah Jahangir
Gian Lorenzo Bernini - marble sculptures
Martyrdom of Saint Lawrence (probable date)
with Pietro Bernini - Boy with a Dragon
Frans Hals - Shrovetide Revellers
Peter Paul Rubens
Adoration of the Magi
Mars and Rhea Silvia (approximate date)
Nicholas Stone - floor tomb of Sir William Curle in St Etheldreda's church, Old Hatfield, England 
Diego Velázquez - The Lunch
Hendrick Cornelisz Vroom - Dutch Ships Ramming Spanish Galleys off the Flemish Coast in October 1602

Births 
January 19 – Lucas Faydherbe, Dutch sculptor and architect (died 1697)
January 22 – Ludovicus Neefs, Flemish painter (died 1649)
February 5 – Jan Thomas van Ieperen, Flemish painter and engraver (died 1673)
May – John Michael Wright, English baroque portrait painter (died 1694)
August 10 (bapt.) – Ambrosius Brueghel, Flemish painter (died 1675)
October 17 – Dionisio Lazzari, Italian sculptor and architect (died 1689)
November 19 – Eustache Le Sueur, co-founder of the French Academy of painting (died 1655)
November 21 – Tosa Mitsuoki, Japanese painter (died 1691)
December – Gerard ter Borch, Dutch subject painter (died 1681)
December 7 – Evaristo Baschenis, Italian Baroque painter primarily of still lifes (died 1677)
December 31 – Bartolomé Esteban Murillo, Spanish painter best known for his religious works (died 1682)
 date unknown
Emanuel de Witte, Dutch perspective painter (died 1692)
Pellegrino Piola, Italian painter (died 1640)
Paolo Porpora, Italian painter of floral still lifes (died 1670)
Carlo Sacchi, Italian painter and engraver (died 1706)

Deaths
January 1 – Hendrik Goltzius, Dutch printmaker, draughtsman and painter (born 1588)
September – Louis Finson - Flemish painter of the Dutch Golden Age (born 1580)
October 2 – Isaac Oliver, French-born English portrait miniature painter (born 1565)
date unknown
Fabrizio Castello, Italian painter of Genoese origin settled in Spain (born 1562)
Hans Ruprecht Hoffmann, German sculptor (born c.1545)
Giovanni Battista Vernici, Italian painter (born unknown)
Andrea Vicentino, Italian Mannerist painter (born 1542)

References

 
Years of the 17th century in art
1610s in art